Scott Linton (born 6 September 1989), is a Scottish former footballer who played as a defender or midfielder.

He has previously played for Hibernian as a youth player, as well as Cowdenbeath, Dumbarton, Clyde, East Fife and Kelty Hearts.

Career

Cowdenbeath
Born in Glasgow, Linton signed for Cowdenbeath in January 2008. He made over 100 appearances for the 'Blue Brazil'.

Dumbarton
In June 2013 he signed for Dumbarton. He scored his first goal for Dumbarton in November 2013, against Berwick Rangers. On 20 May 2014 Linton agreed a new one-year deal with the club. He left the club on 5 May 2015 having made a total of 67 appearances for the club, scoring once.

Clyde
He signed a pre contract agreement at Clyde FC in April 2015 for the 2015–16 season. Scoring the winner on his league debut away against Stirling Albion He became Clyde's regular penalty taker despite never having taken one at senior level before joining the club. On 12 September 2015, Linton scored in a 4–2 win against Annan Athletic at Broadwood. He the scored the winner at Queen's Park in the play-off final second leg, but Clyde lost 3–2 on aggregate and failed to win promotion from League Two. Linton made 41 appearances in all competitions in 2015–16, finishing the season as top scorer with 13 goals and registering 13 assists, also winning a number of the club's Player of the Year Awards. Linton left Clyde in June 2017, after two seasons with the side.

East Fife
After leaving Clyde, Linton signed for Scottish League One club East Fife for the 2017–18 season. He was released in May 2019 having made 44 appearances for the club, scoring four times.

Kelty Hearts
Linton signed for Kelty Hearts for the 2019–20 season and was a major contributor to the club being declared Lowland League champions with 18 goals and 18 assists from 32 appearances in all competitions. Linton decided to announce his retirement in July 2020.

Career statistics

Honours
Kelty Hearts
Lowland League: 2019–20

References

External links

1989 births
Footballers from Glasgow
Living people
Scottish footballers
Scottish Football League players
Association football defenders
Scottish Professional Football League players
Hibernian F.C. players
Cowdenbeath F.C. players
Dumbarton F.C. players
Clyde F.C. players
East Fife F.C. players
Kelty Hearts F.C. players
Lowland Football League players